The Florida Holocaust Museum is a Holocaust museum located at 55 Fifth Street South in St. Petersburg, Florida. Founded in 1992, it moved to its current location in 1998. Formerly known as the Holocaust Center, the museum officially changed to its current name in 1999. It is one of the largest Holocaust museums in the United States. It was founded by Walter and Edith Lobenberg both of whom were German Jews who escaped persecution in Nazi Germany by immigrating to the United States. Holocaust survivor Elie Wiesel served as Honorary Chairman and cut the ribbon at the 1998 opening ceremony. The Florida Holocaust Museum is one of three Holocaust Museums that are accredited by the American Alliance of Museums. The museum works with the local community and survivors of the Holocaust to spread awareness and to educate the public on the history of the Holocaust.

History

Founders
The Florida Holocaust Museum was founded by Walter Loebenberg and his wife Edith Loebenberg in 1992. Both of them had been born in Germany and had escaped Nazi persecution. Walter Loebenberg was born in Wächtersbach, Germany, but due to Nazi prosecution of his father and the subsequent difficulties in running the family store, the Loebenberg family moved to Frankfurt in 1936. It was in Frankfurt in 1938 that the Loebenberg family experienced Kristallnacht, with Walter narrowly escaping physical harm and being forced to hide. Eventually, through the support of an aunt already living in the United States, Walter Loebenberg was able to immigrate successfully and eventually moved to Chicago. He then served in the United States Army for the duration of the World War II after being drafted in 1942.

After completing his time in the military, Walter Loebenberg would go on to meet Edith Loebenberg, leading to their marriage in 1948.

Museum

The museum was founded by Walter and Edith Lobenberg in 1992. It was founded with the idea of "teaching the members of all races and cultures the inherent worth and dignity of life in order to prevent future genocides". The Holocaust Museum was founded as the Holocaust Center in a space that was rented from the Jewish Community Center (JCC) of Pinellas County in Madeira Beach. The museum started as a collection of 10 Holocaust posters which the founders had acquired over the years. At the JCC, the Holocaust Center hosted its first exhibit, 'Anne Frank in the World', which would attract 24,000 visitors within the first month. As the center proved popular it began to run teaching seminars, lectures, and commemorative events in which visitors could participate. Additionally, the center began to connect with the local educational system; schools in an eight county area surrounding Tampa Bay were provided with study guides, teacher training programs, and presentations by Center staff and Holocaust survivors.

By 1996 the Holocaust Center had grown to such a point that a larger space was needed and thus the Board of Directors voted to buy and renovate a new building for the museum. This new building, a former bank, was 27,000 square feet in comparison to the 4,000 square feet in the previous space. The architect chosen for this task was the Israeli-born Nick Benjacob. He also designed the shopping area under the World Trade Center. He would produce the distinctive shape of the new building which prominently featured triangles, explaining that "the era of World War II is so depressing that I did not want to do anything with either circles or squares, because they are whole shapes. I wanted a broken shape. A triangle is a suppressing shape, it is a hard shape, and I wanted to design a feeling for the visitors before they even entered the museum". This move was completed in 1998, and in January 1999, the Holocaust Center officially changed its name to the Florida Holocaust Museum. Elie Wiesel attended the 1998 opening ceremony in which he served as the Honorary Chairman.

In this new building the Florida Holocaust Museum has continued its mission of human rights awareness and Holocaust awareness. The new building was able to welcome 65,000 visitors in its first year. Additionally, the extra space in the new building has allowed for the expansion of the museum's library which includes both audio and visual materials. The current building features three floors with the permanent exhibit as well as archives being located on the first floor, and temporary galleries on the second and third floor. The first major exhibition was the boxcar #113 069-5, which became part of the permanent collection.

Exhibits

Permanent collection

The permanent collection of the Florida Holocaust Museum is housed on the first floor in an exhibit titled: "History, Heritage, and Hope". This exhibit features various artifacts from the period and takes the form of a self-guided audio tour through the history of the Holocaust beginning with the history of antisemitism and life before World War II, followed by the rise of Hitler, Nazis, and anti-Jewish legislation. The history of other victim groups, ghettos and rescue are shown as well. The exhibition culminates with sections about concentration camps and killing centers.  The final area presented is 'Lessons for Today', where visitors learn about other genocides and acts of hatred occurring today. 
The centerpiece of the permanent collection is an actual box car #113 069-5 (from Gdynia, Poland) that transported victims of the Nazi regime to the concentration camps. It rests upon original track from the Treblinka Killing Center as a silent tribute to those murdered in the Holocaust. Notably, the collection of prolific artist and Holocaust survivor, Toby Knobel Fluek, was recently donated to the museum's permanent collection and is in the process of being processed by museum staff.

Temporary exhibits

On the second and third floors of the building, temporary exhibits are hosted with topics varying from artistic interpretations of the events of the Holocaust to informative exhibits which illuminate related topics, such as the Nuremberg Trials. The third floor also features a large open gallery in which lectures, presentations and events are held as well. One recent exhibition called "Operation Finale: The Capture and Trial of Adolf Eichmann", recounts the capturing of a Nazi criminal and it is the first to do so in the United States. It was curated by former Mossad agent, Avner Avraham, who retired from Israel's National Intelligence Agency. Another temporary exhibit features promoter Bill Graham who fled Nazis as a kid, and will run until 2019. A new exhibit will give guests a virtual tour of a concentration camp in Poland called 'The Last Goodbye', guided by a Holocaust survivor himself.

Programs

The Florida Holocaust Museum additionally runs several programs of outreach within the community with the aim of continuing their mission of raising awareness of human rights. They include "Speak Up, Speak Now!", which is a multi-session program that aims to engage students in discussion and includes guest speakers such as Holocaust survivors, law enforcement officers, and activists. The Anne Frank Humanitarian award, established in 2001, recognizes high school juniors who have shown humanitarian efforts in and outside of school. The museum also provides police agencies in Florida with Law Enforcement And Society (LEAS) lessons, which are meant to educate officers about the role that German police had in the Holocaust. Additionally, the Generations After group is made up of the daughters, sons, and grandchildren of Holocaust survivors, who are dedicated to telling their families' stories.

Education

The Florida Holocaust Museum sends speakers to schools and brings classes to the museum. As part of its education program, teachers can borrow material for teaching about the Holocaust for free. In 2014 the trunks cost $300 to ship around the US, reached 17 states, and impacted around 50,000 people.

The Florida Holocaust Museum also offers school-group docent-led tours. School group tours take about two hours and are available for fifth through twelfth grades.

The museum offers free after-school workshops to all teachers in the state of Florida.

In response to COVID-19, the Florida Holocaust Museum created a Virtual Education Outreach Program.

Volunteer

The Florida Holocaust Museum also runs volunteer programs where everyone from students to the elderly is able to assist in the educational process. The museum is one of many organizations worldwide where young Austrians can serve their Austrian Holocaust Memorial Service.

See also

Austrian Holocaust Memorial Service

External links
  
 Courage and Compassion exhibit at the museum in August 2009

References

1992 establishments in Florida
Holocaust museums in Florida
Institutions accredited by the American Alliance of Museums
Museums established in 1992
Museums in St. Petersburg, Florida